St John's College Boat Club, Oxford (SJCBC) is a rowing club part of the University of Oxford, England, located on the River Thames at Oxford. The club was founded in 1863.

Colours
The St John's College Boat Club colours are a white shield with blue cross upon a navy blue background. The Men's 1st boats race in all-white uniform with blue trim and the 2nd crews compete in all-blue with white trim. The Women's boats race in all-black with blue trim. The Boat Club flag consists of a lamb carrying a flag atop a navy blue cross set against a white background. The symbol of the lamb and flag is that of St John the Baptist, after whom the College was named.

Honours

Henley Royal Regatta

See also
Oxford University Rowing Clubs
University rowing (UK)

References

External links
 SJCBC website

Rowing clubs of the University of Oxford
Boat club
Sports clubs established in 1863
1863 establishments in England
Rowing clubs in Oxfordshire
Rowing clubs of the River Thames